The 1934 Baylor Bears football team represented Baylor University in the Southwest Conference (SWC) during the 1934 college football season. In their ninth season under head coach Morley Jennings, the Bears compiled a 3–7 record (1–5 against conference opponents), finished in last place in the conference, and were outscored by opponents by a combined total of 140 to 91. They played their home games at Carroll Field in Waco, Texas. Joe Jack Pierce and Warren "Red" Weathers were the team captains.

Schedule

References

Baylor
Baylor Bears football seasons
Baylor Bears football